State Rowdy is a 1989 Indian Telugu-language action film directed by B. Gopal. The film stars Chiranjeevi, while Radha, Bhanupriya, Sharada, Rao Gopal Rao, Thiagarajan and Nutan Prasad are among the cast.

Plot
Kalicharan is a rowdy who kidnaps all the leading rowdies from different parts of the state working under two rivals, and provides them with good jobs. Asha has interest in him and assists with his good deeds. To get rid of this "state rowdy," the villains learn that he has a mother and a cousin, Radha, and informed them on his whereabouts.

It is known that Kali is actually Prithvi who was aspiring to become a police officer but could not get the job due to Naagamani, even though he performed well at the interview and tests. He becomes an outlaw due to this and turns as state rowdy to eliminate all the other rowdies by taking law into his own hands.

When his mother and Radha see him, he is forced to reveal the secret that he is actually a police informer working for Naagamani to bring criminals to justice. Naagamani has lost her husband and daughter in fighting the villains.

Later, it is learnt that Asha is Naagamani's daughter, and she is accused of murdering Rao Gopal Rao's younger brother. The rest of the story forms on how she is acquitted with Kali's help, and how Kali and Naagamani get rid of their enemies by bringing them to justice.

Cast

Chiranjeevi as Kalicharan/Prithvi
Radha as Radha
Bhanupriya as Asha
Rao Gopal Rao
Sharada as SP Naagamani M. Rao
Thiagarajan as Rao Gopal Rao's brother
Nutan Prasad as Bankamatti Bhaskar Rao
Jayamalini
Jyothi Lakshmi
Kaikala Satyanarayana
Allu Rama Lingaiah

Soundtrack

External links

1989 films
1980s Telugu-language films
Indian action films
Indian gangster films
Films directed by B. Gopal
Films scored by Bappi Lahiri
1980s masala films
Films with screenplays by the Paruchuri brothers
1989 action films